Afzal Hossain is a Awami League politician in Bangladesh and the former Member of Parliament of Dhaka-29.

Career
Hossain was elected to parliament from Dhaka-29 as an Awami League candidate in 1973.

Death
Hossain died on 29 March 2007.

References

Awami League politicians
Living people
1st Jatiya Sangsad members
Year of birth missing (living people)